Stromatium fulvum is a species of beetle in the family Cerambycidae. It was first described by Charles Joseph Devillers in 1789, and while his name was preoccupied, it is treated as valid following ICZN Article 23.9.5; it has most commonly been referred to as Stromatium unicolor, and more recently as Stromatium auratum but these names are junior synonyms.

References

Hesperophanini
Beetles described in 1789